Lucky Thompson Plays Happy Days Are Here Again is an album led by saxophonist Lucky Thompson recorded in 1965 and released on the Moodsville label.

Reception

AllMusic awarded the album 3 stars.

Track listing 
 "Happy Days Are Here Again" (Milton Ager, Jack Yellen) – 5:25  
 "Safari" (Lucky Thompson) – 6:09  
 "Cry Me a River" (Arthur Hamilton) – 4:59  
 "You Don't Know What Love Is" (Gene de Paul, Don Raye) – 5:27  
 "People" (Bob Merrill, Jule Styne) – 4:40  
 "As Time Goes By" (Herman Hupfeld) – 5:20

Personnel 
Lucky Thompson – tenor saxophone, soprano saxophone  
Jack Melady – harp (tracks 2 & 4)
Tommy Flanagan – piano
George Tucker – bass
Walter Perkins – drums

References 

Lucky Thompson albums
1965 albums
Prestige Records albums
Albums produced by Don Schlitten
Albums recorded at Van Gelder Studio